Yanko Blagoev Kosturkov (born 7 June 1982) is a Bulgarian football player, currently playing for Septemvri Simitli.

Notes

1982 births
Living people
Bulgarian footballers
PFC Akademik Svishtov players
PFC Cherno More Varna players
PFC Marek Dupnitsa players
PFC Beroe Stara Zagora players
First Professional Football League (Bulgaria) players
Expatriate footballers in the Maldives
New Radiant S.C. players

Association football midfielders